Sabitov is a masculine surname of Tatar origin, its feminine counterpart is Sabitova. It may refer to
Ravil Sabitov (born 1968), Russian football coach and former player
Renat Sabitov (born 1985), Russian football player

Russian-language surnames